KAKX (89.3 FM) is a radio station broadcasting a Variety format. It is licensed to Mendocino, California, United States. The station is currently owned by Mendocino Unified School District.

References

External links

AKX
Radio stations established in 1997
1997 establishments in California